The following article is a list of episodes of the Norwegian television show Ikke gjør dette hjemme.

Season 1 

The first season also featured the Appliances deathmatch, where the hosts try to find the ultimate kitchen appliance for all tasks. This segment was dropped for season 2.

Season 2

Season 3

References 

Lists of reality television series episodes
Lists of Norwegian television series episodes